Shri Shivaji Shikshan Prasarak Mandal Polytechnic, Barshi offers Diploma courses in the stream of Industrial Electronics, Civil Engineering and Computer Sciences. The courses are approved by the Maharashtra State Board for Technical Education.

References

 Profile on IndiaStudyChannel.com

Universities and colleges in Maharashtra
Solapur district